Emmanuel Samadia (born 19 April 2001) is a Sierra Leonean footballer who plays as a midfielder for Liga Leumit club Hapoel Rishon LeZion and the Sierra Leone national team.

Club career
After playing for F.C. Kallon in Sierra Leone, he joined Israeli Liga Leumit club Hapoel Umm al-Fahm on a one-month trial in December 2020 and signed a two-year contract with the club in January 2021.

International career
He made his debut for the Sierra Leone national team in October 2020 against Niger. He played for Sierra Leone U20 at the 2020 WAFU U-20 Championship.

References

2001 births
Living people
Sierra Leonean footballers
Sierra Leone international footballers
Sportspeople from Freetown
Association football midfielders
F.C. Kallon players
Hapoel Umm al-Fahm F.C. players
Hapoel Rishon LeZion F.C. players
Liga Leumit players
Sierra Leonean expatriate footballers
Expatriate footballers in Israel
Sierra Leonean expatriate sportspeople in Israel